The Holy September Martyrs, also referred to as the Blessed Martyrs of Carmes (Bienheureux Martyrs des Carmes), is the term sometimes used for 191 Roman Catholics killed at the Carmes Prison in Paris in the September Massacres of 1792 during the French Revolution. 

The victims included three bishops, 127 secular priests, 56 monks and nuns, as well as 5 laypeople. They were beatified by Pope Pius XI 134 years later in October 1926, and are commemorated on 2 September in the Roman Catholic calendar. 

They include André Grasset, the first Canadian-born person to be beatified.

One of the martyrs, Salomone Leclercq, was also canonized by Pope Francis in 2016.

See also
 St. Salomone Leclercq
 Jean Marie du Lau d'Allemans
 Armand de Foucauld de Pontbriand
 Renatus Andrieux

Sources
http://nominis.cef.fr/contenus/saint/1784/Saints-Martyrs-de-Septembre.html
http://www.bxmartyrsde1792.com/index2.html

French beatified people
Beatifications by Pope Pius XI
French clergy killed in the French Revolution
Groups of Christian martyrs of the Early Modern era